Ronnie L. Coleman (born July 9, 1951 in Jasper, Alabama) is a former American football running back who played in the National Football League for the Houston Oilers from 1974 to 1981. He played college football at Alabama A&M.

External links
NFL.com player page

References

1951 births
Living people
People from Jasper, Alabama
Players of American football from Alabama
American football running backs
Alabama A&M Bulldogs football players
Houston Oilers players